The W93 is an American nuclear warhead planned to replace the W76 and W88 warheads on United States Navy submarines from 2034. The warhead will be carried on the new Columbia-class submarines and will use a new aeroshell, the Mark 7 reentry body (RB). The warhead will be designed by Los Alamos National Laboratory.

The Mark 7 RB will also used to house the United Kingdom's new warhead, designed in parallel to the W93 and sharing some non-nuclear components.

Design
The warhead is expected to incorporate improved safety features such as insensitive high explosives. The design will be based on previously tested nuclear components and will not require nuclear testing.

See also
Trident (UK nuclear programme)

References

Nuclear warheads of the United States